Pohara may refer to
Põhara, a village in Estonia
Pohara, a settlement in New Zealand
Pōhara Marae, a meeting ground in Arapuni, New Zealand